Duchess Elisabeth of Mecklenburg-Schwerin (10 August 1869 – 3 September 1955) was a daughter of Frederick Francis II, Grand Duke of Mecklenburg by his third wife Princess Marie of Schwarzburg-Rudolstadt. By her marriage to Frederick Augustus II, she became the consort of the last reigning Grand Duke of Oldenburg.

Family

Elisabeth was related to many of Europe's royal families. She was the eldest child of Frederick Francis II, Grand Duke of Mecklenburg by his third wife Princess Marie of Schwarzburg-Rudolstadt. She was an older sister of Hendrik, Prince consort of the Netherlands, husband of Queen Wilhelmina of the Netherlands, making her an aunt of Queen Juliana of the Netherlands. She was also a younger half-sister of Frederick Francis III, Grand Duke of Mecklenburg-Schwerin. Through Frederick Francis, she was an aunt of Alexandrine, Queen of Denmark and Cecilie, German Crown Princess. Elisabeth was also a half sister of Marie, Grand Duchess of Russia, who was the mother of Grand Duke Cyril Vladimirovich of Russia, the pretender to the Russian throne.

Her paternal grandparents were Paul Frederick, Grand Duke of Mecklenburg and Princess Alexandrine of Prussia. Her maternal grandparents were Prince Adolph of Schwarzburg-Rudolstadt and Princess Mathilde of Schönburg-Waldenburg.

Marriage
On 24 October 1896, Elisabeth married Frederick Augustus, Hereditary Grand Duke of Oldenburg. His first wife Elisabeth Anna had died the previous year, leaving only one surviving daughter: Duchess Sophia Charlotte of Oldenburg. Frederick Augustus was thus in need of a male heir. He succeeded as Grand Duke of Oldenburg in 1900, making Elisabeth Grand Duchess consort of Oldenburg.

They had five children:

Frederick was forced to abdicate his throne at the end of World War I, when the former Grand Duchy of the German Empire joined the post-war German Republic. He and his family took up residence at Rastede Castle, where he took up farming and local industrial interests. A year after his abdication, he asked the Oldenburg Diet for a yearly allowance of 150,000 marks, stating that his financial condition was "extremely precarious".

In 1931, Frederick died in Rastede.

Elisabeth died on 3 September 1955, having been widowed for 24 years.

Honours
  Mecklenburg: Dame's Decoration of the House Order of the Wendish Crown, in Diamonds

Ancestry

References

|-

1869 births
1955 deaths
People from Schwerin
People from the Grand Duchy of Mecklenburg-Schwerin
House of Mecklenburg-Schwerin
Grand Duchesses of Oldenburg
Duchesses of Mecklenburg-Schwerin
Duchesses of Oldenburg
Burials at the Ducal Mausoleum, Gertrudenfriedhof (Oldenburg)
Daughters of monarchs